The Croatia national badminton team represents Croatia in international badminton team competitions. The national team was formed after the establishment of the Croatian Badminton Association in Zagreb. The men's and women's team made their debut in the 2010 European Men's and Women's Team Badminton Championships in Warsaw. 

The Croatian mixed team only played one team tournament, which was in 2011 when the team qualified for the 2011 European Mixed Team Badminton Championships, but was eliminated in the group stage. 

National player Igor Čimbur was called up as a coach for the national team's seniors and juniors.

Participation in European Team Badminton Championships

Men's Team

Women's Team

Mixed Team

Participation in Helvetia Cup

Participation in European Junior Team Badminton Championships
Mixed Team

Current squad 

Men
Zvonimir Đurkinjak
Igor Čimbur
Filip Špoljarec
Luka Ban
Zvonimir Hölbling

Women
Barbara Janičić
Luna Šaban
Nika Matovina
Stella Bavenović

References

Badminton
National badminton teams
Badminton in Croatia